

Bunbury is a locality in the Australian state of South Australia located in the state’s south-east about  south-east of the state capital of Adelaide and about  south-east of the municipal seat in Tailem Bend.

Its boundaries were created on 24 August 2000.  Its name is derived from the Bunbury Homestead which is located within the locality’s boundaries.

The majority land use within Bunbury is ’primary production’ which is concerned with “agricultural production.”  Some land extending from its centre to its western boundary which is occupied by the Bunbury Conservation Reserve is zoned for ‘conservation’.

Bunbury is located within the federal division of Barker, the state electoral district of MacKillop and the local government area of the Coorong District Council.

References

 

Towns in South Australia